The European Delirium Association was founded in 2005 in order to promote research, education and clinical practice in delirium. It serves as a forum to bring together interested researchers, practitioners and policy makers.

In 2006, the inaugural meeting brought together 50 delegates from the disciplines central to delirium including doctors, nurses, and psychologists working in geriatrics, psychiatry, palliative medicine, paediatrics, and neurology. The association has a broad remit, covering research, clinical practice, and promotion of better care through campaigning at local, national, and international levels. The annual scientific congress addresses a wide spectrum of delirium issues including the latest developments in epidemiology, pathophysiology, phenomenology, treatment (including service models), and delirium advocacy.

In 2011, the EDA received the first Delirium Champion Award from the American Delirium Society. Along with the American Delirium Society, the EDA have provided a framework for the interpretation of delirium diagnostic criteria.

The EDA provides research funding, and has been able to coordinate research across its network.

The Annals of Delirium is the official publication of the EDA.

Annual Scientific Congress 

2006 Alkmaar, Netherlands
2007 Limerick, Ireland
2008 Helsinki, Finland
2009 Leeds, UK
2010 Amsterdam, Netherlands
2011 Umea, Sweden
2012 Bielefeld, Germany
2013 Leuven, Belgium
2014 Cremona, Italy
2015 London, UK
2016 Vilamoura, Portugal
2017 Oslo, Norway
2018 Utrecht, Netherlands (1-2 November)
2019 Edinburgh, UK (6-7 September)
2020 Barcelona, Spain

References

External links 
 http://www.europeandeliriumassociation.org
 https://twitter.com/EDA_delirium
 https://www.facebook.com/EDA.delirium

Organizations established in 2005
International medical associations of Europe